Patricia Piccinini (born 1965 in Freetown, Sierra Leone) is an Australian artist who works in a variety of media, including painting, video, sound, installation, digital prints, and sculpture. Her works focus on "unexpected consequences", conveying concerns surrounding bio-ethics and help visualize future dystopias. In 2003, Piccinini represented Australia at the 50th Venice Biennale with a hyperrealist sculpture of her distinctive anthropomorphic animals. In 2016 The Art Newspaper named Piccinini with her "grotesque-cum-cute, hyper-real genetics fantasies in silicone" the most popular contemporary artist in the world after a show in Rio de Janeiro attracted over 444,000 visitors. Natasha Bieniek's portrait of Piccinini was a finalist for the 2022 Archibald Prize.

Early life 
Piccinini was born in Sierra Leone in 1965 to Teodoro and Agnes Piccinini.

She moved to Canberra, Australia when she was 7 years old.  She attended Red Hill Primary, Telopea Park High School and Narrabundah College (a secondary college).

Academia 
After high school, Piccinini began studying economics at Australian National University. Later she completed a Bachelor of Fine Arts in Painting at the Victorian College of the Arts in 1991. In 2016 she was awarded an honorary Doctorate of Visual and Performing Arts by the University of Melbourne's Victorian College of the Arts and appointed their Enterprise Professor.

In 2014 she received the Artist Award from the Melbourne Art Foundation's Awards for the Visual Arts.

Works

1995 to 1997 
Before finding the medium of sculpture, Piccinini experimented with world-building through photography and digital enhancements. ‘The Mutant Genome Project’ (1995), features commercially available designer babies called LUMP (Lifeform with Unevolved Human Properties). Her ‘Protein Lattice’ (1997) series features nude models posing with computer-generated mutant rats. The two series explored the commercial side of science and brought up the question of ethics. 

The Protein Lattice series was inspired by the famous Vacanti mouse experiment in 1996. The experiment formed a human ear on a rat. The research’s objective was to learn more about cells, and how humans can possibly regrow body part.

2000 to 2011 

According to her 2002 National Gallery of Victoria biography:
Piccinini has an ambivalent attitude towards technology and she uses her artistic practice as a forum for discussion about how technology impacts upon life. She is keenly interested in how contemporary ideas of nature, the natural and the artificial are changing our society. Specific works have addressed concerns about biotechnology, such as gene therapy and ongoing research to map the human genome... she is also fascinated by the mechanisms of consumer culture."                 

In 2002, Piccinini presented 'Still Life with Stem Cells', which features a series of flesh-like masses. As she herself says:

"Stems cells are base cellular matter before it is differentiated into specific kinds of cells like skin, liver, bone or brain. Pure unexpressed potential, they contain the possibility for transformation into anything. They are the basic data format of the organic world. Like digital data, their specificity lies in that, while they are intrinsically nothing, they can become anything. They are biomatter for the digital age.

I am interested in how this changes our idea of the body. Already our understanding of the human genome leads us to imagine that we understand the construction of the body at its most intimate level; the stem cell provides us with a generic, plastic material from which we can construct it. In the last ten years, the body has gone from something that is uniquely produced to something that can be reproduced.

This transformation has already occurred, with very little fuss given its magnitude. The question of whether this is a good or a bad thing is both too simplistic and a little academic. As with so much of this biotechnology, the extraordinary has already become the ordinary. The real question is 'what are we going to do with it'. Still life with Stem Cells is one possible answer."

In 2003, Piccinini represented Australia at the 50th Venice Biennale. The work exhibited was 'We Are Family', an exhibition which displayed humanlike mutant figures behaving like humans.

'The Long-Awaited' (2008) was a later work attempting to explore the theme of empathy through a lifelike sculpture of a child cradling a manatee-human hybrid.

2012 to 2013 

The Skywhale was a work commissioned by the ACT Government for its Centenary year. The ABC described the work as a "hot air balloon in the shape of a tortoise-like animal featuring huge dangling udders made from four hectares of nylon". The budget for the project was $300,000 and has been the subject of comments made by ACT Chief Ministers Jon Stanhope and Andrew Barr.

2014 to 2015 

In a 2014 interview with the Sydney Morning Herald, Piccinini said of her work, "It's about evolution, nature – how nature is such a wonderful thing, we're just here to witness it, it's not here for us – genetic engineering, changing the body." Following her 2014 win in the Melbourne Art Foundation's Awards, she went on to say that:

The thing about this award on some levels is that my work ... all of it has this first impact, the sort of impact of spectacle. It's beautifully made, strong, aesthetic, so people are interested in that and it draws them in, and then they get interested in the idea. It takes a while to get to the idea. It's not easy. So this award says, "We get it, we get what you're trying to do, we've gone beyond the surface, we can see that there are ideas underneath, and these ideas are about the opportunity for connection".

In 2015 she presented as part of a group exhibition titled Menagerie at the Australian Centre for Contemporary Art, Melbourne.

2016 

In 2016, the TAC commissioned Piccinini to work in collaboration with Dr. David Logan, a senior research fellow at the Monash University Accident Research Centre, and trauma surgeon Dr. Christian Kenfield, for Project Graham— as part of the TAC's road safety campaign Towards Zero. "Graham", a lifelike, interactive sculpture, highlights how vulnerable the human body is to the forces involved in auto accidents. As the TAC explains: "Graham highlights the changes we need to make to protect ourselves from our own mistakes on the road. At the centre of this system is the belief that human health is more important than anything else, he is the embodiment of the Towards Zero vision."

2018 
The joint exhibition 'Patricia Piccinini & Joy Hester Through Love ...' at TarraWarra Museum of Art included a new site specific work 'Sanctuary': combining a sculpture of a pair of embracing anthropomorphic bonobo figures of silicone, fiberglass and hair; with a drawing on paper and digital wall print of multiple human limbs forming a horizon.

2021 
As part of the inaugural Rising Festival, Piccinini created the exhibition "A Miracle Constantly Repeated", which was her first extensive hometown show in almost two decades. The exhibition ran from May 2021 until June 2022, as a result of delays resulting from COVID-19 lockdowns, as well as high demand. Taking place in the Flinders Street station ballroom, and consisting of a combination of hyper-real silicone sculptures, dioramas, video, sound and light, the exhibition explores humanity’s relationship to technology and the environment, and conveys Piccinini's empathetic vision of a future built on resilience and care.

Meaning 
Piccinini never truly states what her personal beliefs are, most of the time opting for ambiguity. She uses her art as a forum for viewers to project their own beliefs on and start discussions. The grotesque visuals and themes offer a sense of fantasy; the controversial world she created encourages viewers to think. The idea that art should come from the artist's personal experience is completely disregarded. In an interview with Dr. Louisa Penfold in 2020 about her ‘Art in Childhood’ series, Piccinini stated:To me, art is really about having a conversation with others around ideas that are relevant and pertinent to our times. In the 90s, making art around big ideas wasn’t as common and people were suspicious and would be like, “that’s not real art because it’s not pure, it is sullied by real-life”.

The only reason I make art is to be a part of the cultural conversation around what is happening to us in our lives. Every single work I make is around that and that’s the value in the work. I don’t think that I could make work just about me and my own emotional issues. I mean, my emotional issues are certainly my own brand that informs how I look at the world but my art is not about my personal history.

Responses 
Australian art critic John McDonald gives two reasons for disliking Piccinini's body of work: her method of employing artisans to create her designs: "The problem with this method is that the artist's role becomes that of a factory manager." and her engagement with issues such as cross-species relationships: "Given the current state of the planet, in which political leaders are allowing the most blatant forms of racism and ethnic tension to become normalised, Piccinini's interspecies fantasies seem horribly far-fetched."

Screen studies professor and animal ethicist Barbara Creed says Piccinini's work is loving and heals wounds of divisions: "In profound ways, Piccinini's artistic practice calls to the spectator to consider a new way of being, a new form of opening out an embracing difference, through new ways of looking ... that encourages us to look alongside and with her creations while reminding us we are all animals."

In the May 2017, Artforum featured Piccinini; professor of contemporary art Charles Green commented on Piccinini’s style of hyperrealism. In his review, Green acknowledged the “unfashionable” hyper-real style associated with the late 60s and commended Piccinini for putting her own spin on it. Green reasoned that by creating an intriguing narrative Piccinini was able to make hyperrealism appealing to the general audience.

Post-humanism 
Patricia Piccinini's works have been closely associated with and interpreted as post-human due to their subjects. The depiction of vulnerability through themes of mutation, reproduction, motherhood, and childhood explores the economy of death. Her work affirms that posthuman ideology and femininity is liberation from modern practices such as genetic engineering and animal farms. For example, Piccinini engaged in the theme of surrogate motherhood, and inter-species relationships to convey environmental turmoil. The surrogacy invokes concerns in regards to scientific exploitation, and rejects the idea of a normative human species.

See also 
Frankenstein argument
Ron Mueck (similar artist)
Transhumanism
Australian art

References

Further reading 
 Gether, Christian (ed.) ... et al. A world of love: Patricia Piccinini. ARKEN Museum of Modern Art, 2019. Content – Foreword / Christian Gether. Embrace the Unknown: Patricia Piccinini and the Aesthetics of Care / Dea Antonsen. Your Place Is My Place / Rosi Braidotti in conversation with Patricia Piccinini. CRISPR and Emergent Forms of Life / Eben Kirksey. 
Mcdonald, Helen. Patricia Piccinini: nearly beloved. Piper Press, 2012. 

Queensland Art Gallery. Patricia Piccinini: curious affection. 2019. Content – Arts Minister's message / Leeanne Enoch. Foreword / Chris Saines. Patricia Piccinini : curious affection / Peter McKay. Affirmation and a passion for difference : looking at Piccinini looking at us / Rosi Braidotti. Lines in the sand : a science writer comes to terms with Patricia Piccinini / Elizabeth Finkel. Familiar / China Miéville. 
Mondloch, Kate. A capsule aesthetic: feminist materialisms in new media art. Minneapolis: University of Minnesota Press, 2018.

External links 

Mondloch, Kate. A capsule aesthetic: feminist materialisms in new media art. Minnesota, 2018. 
Green, Charles. "Patricia Piccinini: Tolarno Galleries." Artforum International, vol. 55, no. 9, May 2017, p. 356.

Feature profile of Patricia Piccinini in Sculpture magazine

21st-century Australian sculptors
1965 births
Living people
People from Freetown
Sierra Leonean artists
Victorian College of the Arts alumni
Australian contemporary artists
Australian people of Italian descent
Hyperrealist artists
University of Melbourne women
20th-century Australian sculptors
20th-century Australian women artists
21st-century Australian women artists
Artists from the Australian Capital Territory
People educated at Narrabundah College